No Country for Old Men is a 2007 American neo-Western thriller film produced, directed, written, and edited by Joel and Ethan Coen. Based on Cormac McCarthy's novel of the same name, the film is about an ordinary man to whom chance delivers a fortune that is not his, and the ensuing cat-and-mouse drama as the paths of three men intertwine in the desert landscape of 1980 West Texas. The film stars Josh Brolin, Tommy Lee Jones, and Javier Bardem, with Woody Harrelson, Kelly Macdonald, Garret Dillahunt, Tess Harper, and Beth Grant in featured roles.

The film premiered at the 60th Cannes Film Festival on May 19, 2007, where it was nominated for the Palme d'Or. After a successful screening at the Toronto International Film Festival, Miramax and Paramount Vantage initially gave the film a limited release in 28 theaters in the United States on November 9. The film was later given a release in 860 theaters in the United States and Canada on November 21. No Country for Old Men has grossed a worldwide total of over $172 million on a production budget of $25 million. Rotten Tomatoes, a review aggregator, surveyed 265 reviews and judged 93 percent to be positive.

No Country for Old Men garnered awards and nominations in a variety of categories, with particular praise for its direction, screenplay, and Bardem's performance. At the 80th Academy Awards, the film received eight nominations, the most nominations at the ceremony tied with There Will Be Blood. It went on to win four awards including Best Picture, Best Director, (Joel and Ethan Coen), Best Supporting Actor (Bardem), and Best Adapted Screenplay (Ethan and Joel Coen). The Coen brothers became the second pair of individuals to win Best Directing for helming the same film. No Country for Old Men earned four nominations at the 65th Golden Globe Awards, winning for Best Screenplay for the Coen brothers and Golden Globe for Best Supporting Actor for Bardem. At the 61st British Academy Film Awards, the film received nine nominations and won for Best Direction, Best Supporting Actor, and Best Cinematography.

At the Producers Guild of America Awards, No Country for Old Men won for Best Theatrical Motion Picture. The Coen brothers received the Outstanding Directing – Feature Film Award from the Directors Guild of America. The cast garnered the Screen Actors Guild Award for Outstanding Performance by a Cast in a Motion Picture, and the Coens' screenplay won the Writers Guild of America Award for Best Adapted Screenplay. The National Board of Review named it the Best Film. The American Film Institute and included the film in its annual listing of the top ten films of 2007.

Accolades

Notes

See also 
2007 in film

References

External links 
 

Lists of accolades by film